Idioms in the Thai language are usually derived from various natural or cultural references. Many include rhyming and/or alliteration, and their distinction from aphorisms and proverbs are not always clear. This is a list of such idioms.

References

 wrutera = udiof3=// lang 

ШЩҳы90ыҸ
Thai language
Thai language